Joseph D. Massei (1899 – May 1971), or Joe Massey, was an American gangster of Italian-Irish origins.
He was involved in the Detroit bootleg liquor trade in the Prohibition era and was arrested many times, but was only imprisoned once.
In 1936 he moved to Miami Beach, Florida, and became a central figure in illegal gambling.
He was a consiglieri of the mob, and helped resolve disputes between the gangsters.
He acted as the Detroit mob's money man, funneling illegal earnings into legitimate businesses in Miami.
He died at home in Miami Beach at the age of 71.

Detroit

Joe Massei was born in 1899 to Daniel Massei, an Italian immigrant, and Margaret Daisey from Ireland.
He joined the Mafia as a "soldier".
He was arrested in Detroit on charges of armed robbery on May 24, 1920 and August 11, 1921, but was discharged on both occasions.
He was arrested for suspected involvement in a murder on August 31, 1925 but was discharged.
In 1930 Massei was named Public Enemy #1 in Detroit.
In 1931 he and Peter Licavoli of Detroit were to stand trial for murder, but the chief witness for the prosecution vanished at the last minute.
In 1932 he was identified as one of the "people in Canada" who were funding shipments of liquor across Lake Erie to the United States.
On June 15, 1932 the gangster Ezra Milford Jones was shot dead at the bar of the Stork Club in Detroit, an exclusive speakeasy.
Massei and Pete Licavoli were among the Italian mobsters identified as being present.

Massei was arrested for murder again on February 3, 1933 but was dismissed by the court on May 15, 1934.
In 1933 Massei was convicted by a jury of carrying concealed weapons.
He was sentenced to 60 days for contempt of court in September 1933, which he served in the Wayne County Jail, Detroit.
In August 1934 the Toronto Star reported that Massei was suspected of a recent kidnapping of John Sackville Labatt, president of the Labatt Brewing Company, a charge that he indignantly denied.
On October 4, 1934 Massei, Charles Bracco, and Joe Bommarito left a Detroit club at 2:30am with the gambling kingpin Gerald Jimmy Hayes.
Hayes was found dead later, beaten and shot in the head but not robbed.

Miami Beach

Massei moved to Miami Beach and in March 1936 registered with the police as a convicted felon.
He seems to have maintained his links with Detroit mobsters running the numbers racket such as Peter Licavoli, William Tocco and Joe Zirilli.
It was said that due to his ability to avoid conviction he had been given the status of "Counselor" (consiglieri) by the mob, and later served as a mediator in disputes.
Apparently he was the "money man" of the Detroit mob, investing the profits from criminal activities in Miami hotels, bistros and casinos.
He owned the Miami Provision Co., which was apparently a legitimate business, and sent Christmas turkeys to Miami Beach policemen he favored.
The Miami Provision Company supplied groceries and meat to hotels on the Gold Coast.
Massei was also involved in running gambling dens.

Massei was arrested for vagrancy in January 1937 and again in February 1940, but in both cases was quickly released.
Until the fall of 1947 he owned a house in Miami Beach on Pine Tree Drive. 
He then moved to the Grand Hotel in Miami Beach, a haunt of hoodlums and gambling operators such as Joe Adonis, Anthony Carfano, Charles Fischetti, Jake Guzik and Ralph Buglio from Chicago.
Massei lived in a penthouse on the Grand Hotel on 23rd street, and owned property on Flamingo Waterway.
He was known in Miami as "the leader of the Detroit Purple Gang".
Massei was a friend of Moe Dalitz, but the two denied any business relationship.
Massei used to joke with Dalitz, offering to make him a member of the Mafia if Dalitz would make him a member of the Purple Gang.
Massei became one of the leaders of a national gambling consortium, along with Meyer Lansky, Alfred Polizzi, Joe Sonken and others.
In 1946 Massei was one of the regular visitors to Al Capone's estate on Palm Island, as were Lansky, Tony Accardo, Jimmy Doyle and Joseph Fischetti. 
Capone died there in January 1947.

When the Desert Inn opened in Las Vegas on April 24, 1950 Massei was among the mafiosi attendees, as were William Tocco, Sam Maceo, Peter Licavoli and Frank Milano.
They kept a low profile as did Dalitz, who was also present.
Massei was arrested for the last time in a downtown Detroit motel in 1952 when police broke up a formal meeting of leading gambling operators.
The Chicago Crime Commission records include a memorandum dated February 13, 1953 that reported "... that information was received that Leonard Patrick, Dave Yaras, and Joe Massei, the latter formerly of Detroit, had been operating the Sans Souci gambling establishment in Havana, Cuba."
On February 8, 1959 the Miami Herald ran a story on a fight at Sonny's Restaurant on 23rd street in which Dave Yaras, who was out on bail for a Miami Beach holdup, had beaten an unidentified Cuban with a pistol butt. 
Joe Massei was on the scene, and greeted the six policemen who turned up to investigate. 
No police report was filed and the Herald reporter could not get any clear information on what had happened.

On June 18, 1971 the FBI confirmed that Joseph D. "Little Joe" Massei had died at his Miami Beach home.
His funeral had been attended by many members of the underworld including William Tocco of Detroit and George Joseph Angersola of Cleveland.

Notes

Sources

1899 births
1971 deaths
American gangsters of Italian descent
American gangsters of Irish descent
American gangsters
Prohibition-era gangsters
Gangsters from Detroit